Tscharna Rayss (1890-1965) was a Russian-Israeli botanist, phycologist, and mycologist noted for studying species in the Mediterranean and Red Sea.

References 

1890 births
1965 deaths
Israeli women scientists
Israeli botanists
Russian women scientists
20th-century Russian botanists
Russian women botanists